Minister of Communications may refer to:

Minister of Communications (Canada)
Ministry of Communications (Japan)
Minister of Communications (South Africa)
Ministry of Transportation and Communications (Taiwan)